Expanse or The Expanse may refer to:

Media and entertainment

The Expanse franchise 
 The Expanse (novel series), a series of science fiction novels by James S. A. Corey
 The Expanse (TV series), a television adaptation of the novel series

Star Trek franchise 
 "The Expanse" (Star Trek: Enterprise episode), the 26th episode of the second season of the TV series Star Trek: Enterprise
 The Expanse (Star Trek novel), the novelization of the episode
 The Expanse (Star Trek location), the Delphic Expanse, a region of space in the Star Trek universe

Other uses 
 Expanse, Saskatchewan, an unincorporated area in Saskatchewan, Canada

See also
 Expansion (disambiguation)